Vivid is the debut studio album by South Korean singer Ailee. It was released on September 30, 2015, by YMC Entertainment and distributed by LOEN Entertainment.

Background and release
On September 21, 2015, it was revealed that Ailee would release her first full album on September 30, titled Vivid. The title track of the album was revealed to be "Mind Your Own Business". On September 22, the first music video teaser for "Mind Your Own Business" was released. On September 24, 2015, Ailee released the album's tracklist and album jacket cover. On September 29, 2015, the music video for "Mind Your Own Business" was released. The music video for the second single, "Insane" was released on October 1, 2015.

Promotions
Ailee had her comeback stage on M! Countdown on October 1, following performances on Music Bank, Show! Music Core, Inkigayo and Show Champion. Besides "Mind Your Own Business", she  performed the tracks, "Insane" and "How Can Someone Be This Way". She won her first trophy for promotions of this album on Show Champion on October 7, 2015.

Track listing

Charts

Release history

References

Ailee albums
2015 albums
Korean-language albums
Kakao M albums
YMC Entertainment albums